The Ruts (later known as Ruts DC) are an English reggae-influenced punk rock band, notable for the 1979 UK top 10 hit single "Babylon's Burning", and an earlier single "In a Rut", which was not a hit but was highly regarded and regularly played by BBC Radio 1 disc jockey John Peel. The band's newfound success was cut short by the death of lead singer Malcolm Owen from a heroin overdose in 1980. Despite this the band continued under a different musical style as Ruts D.C. until 1983 when they disbanded, the band later reformed in 2007.

Career

Formation and early days
The Ruts were formed on 18 August 1977. On 16 September 1977, the band  made their live debut, playing three songs during a break in a set by Mr Softy (another Fox band) at The Target, a pub in Northolt, Middlesex. The band consisted of singer Malcolm Owen (vocals), Paul Fox (guitar), John "Segs" Jennings (bass) and Dave Ruffy (drums). Ruffy moved from bass to drums after original drummer Paul Mattocks left, and the band was active in anti-racist causes as part of the Misty in Roots People Unite collective based in Southall, West London, playing several benefits for Rock Against Racism. Although the band were often described as coming from Southall, Owen was from Hayes, Fox moved from Kilburn to Hayes in the 1960s, whilst Ruffy and Segs were based in South London. Ruffy had been born in York, but spent his formative years in the East End of London, whilst Segs grew up in Southend-on-Sea, having been born in the East End.

Schoolboy friends Fox and Owen shared a mutual interest in music, having met at Hayes Manor School. In the early 1970s they lived together in a commune on the Isle of Anglesey off the coast of North Wales, where they formed a rock band called Aslan with Paul Mattock, who played flute, guitar and keyboards and later became the Ruts' first drummer.

Post Office telephone engineer Jennings met record shop manager Ruffy in 1976 and became interested in punk after discussing the latter's Ramones' T-shirt. Meanwhile, Owen's interest in punk was piqued when he saw the Sex Pistols playing live. At the time, Fox was playing with Ruffy in a funk band, Hit and Run, which included J. D. Nicholas (who went on to join The Commodores in the U.S.) and sixteen-year-old saxophone player Gary Barnacle, who later played on several Ruts songs. Hit and Run were a covers band who released one single, a version of Sam the Sham and the Pharaohs' 1965 hit "Wooly Bully". The Ruts' initial history is described in an audio interview with Jennings, conducted by Alan Parker, which appears on the album Bustin' Out.

1970s
Early Ruts songs recorded at The Former Orange studios in London's Covent Garden on 1 October 1977 were "Stepping Bondage", "Rich Bitch", "Out of Order", "I Ain't Sofisticated" and "Lobotomy". The group began to evolve and become more musically adventurous, incorporating reggae and dub elements into their repertoire. Dave Ruffy returned to the drums and a new bassist, 'Segs' Jennings, was recruited. The new Ruts line-up debuted supporting Wayne County and the Electric Chairs at High Wycombe town hall on 25 January 1978.

The Ruts' first single, "In a Rut" was finally released on People Unite in January 1979, having been recorded back on 24 April 1978 at the Free Range 8-track studios. It was backed up with anti-heroin tirade "H-Eyes" on the B-side ("You're so young, you take smack for fun/It's gonna screw your head, you're gonna wind up dead"). DJ John Peel expressed his admiration for the group on air (as can be heard on a retrospective 1978 radio show clip on the In a Can album) and a session for the BBC swiftly followed the same month. DJ David Jensen also showcased the band in a further session recorded for the BBC in February 1979. A second Peel session was in May 1979.

In 1979, after a chance meeting with the Damned drummer Rat Scabies, the band toured the UK as the Damned's support act. A bootleg of their 3 November slot at Strathclyde University includes a rendition of the Damned's "Love Song" as well as a cover version of the rock and roll standard "Blue Suede Shoes". The Damned also played live covers of "In a Rut" during this period as evidenced on the Noise: The Best of the Damned Live album.

In June their debut single for Richard Branson's Virgin Records, "Babylon's Burning" became reached number 7 in the UK Singles Chart, prompting an appearance on BBC Television's Top of the Pops. The second Virgin single, "Something That I Said", followed in August 1979 and garnered a second Top of the Pops spot. The B-side was a reggae track "Give Youth a Chance" (also known as "Blackman's Pinch") originally recorded for the band's John Peel session in May.

Their debut album The Crack was produced by Mick Glossop and released in September 1979, reaching number 16 in the UK Albums Chart. The two singles "Babylon's Burning" and "Something That I Said" were re-recorded for the album. Edited from the album, the band's third single for Virgin at the end of October 1979 was the roots reggae track "Jah War", about the Metropolitan Police's Special Patrol Group's violence in Southall disturbances in April 1979. However, the BBC refused to play it, labelling the song as "too political".

1980s
On 11 February 1980, the band returned to a BBC studio for their third Peel session, two tracks of which – "Demolition Dancing" and "Secret Soldiers" – later appeared on Virgin's posthumous Grin & Bear It album.

By this time, singer Malcolm Owen was suffering with health problems; a combination of sore throats and a heroin addiction. Contrary to some later reports, which suggested he had started taking heroin when his wife, Roxana had left him, Owen had been dabbling with heroin since the time he and Fox spent in Wales. A UK tour was arranged, the 'Back to Blighty' tour, but a number of dates had to be cancelled due to Owen's condition. What turned out to be the last Ruts gig with Owen took place at Plymouth Polytechnic on 26 February 1980.

On 27 March 1980, the Ruts released their fifth single, "Staring at the Rude Boys", a comment on the rapidly rising Two Tone scene. It was backed by another reggae song "Love in Vain". The single reached the No. 22 spot on the UK Singles Chart.

The Ruts backed Laurel Aitken who was then signed to Secret Affair's record label, I-Spy Records, on a Peel session for BBC Radio 1, in April 1980, and also backed Aitken on his support tour to Secret Affair. The line-up was Aitken, Fox, Jennings, Ruffy, Owen and Barnacle. The band also played for Aitken on his single, "Rudi Got Married".

With their latest UK tour sold out in advance and a US tour lined up, the band began work on their second album in early 1980. Having been forced to cancel a number of UK tour dates, the other three band members fired their frontman over his drug addiction, shortly after completing work on their next single, "West One (Shine on Me)". After negotiations, Owen briefly rejoined the band.

Despite having spent time living at his parents’ house, free from heroin, Malcolm Owen was found dead in the bathroom of his parents' house in Hayes, from a heroin overdose on 14 July 1980 at the age of 26. Prophetically, the track "H-eyes", which was the B-side of their first single "In a Rut", was a song against heroin use, and two other songs, "Dope for Guns" from the album The Crack, plus reggae lament "Love in Vein" ("don't want you in my arms no more") were also anti-drug songs. A year later, the Damned wrote a song, "The Limit Club", about their deceased friend which mentions the "velvet claws" that Fox talked about with reference to Owen's heroin addiction.

On 22 August 1980, the band's sixth and final single was released, "West One (Shine on Me)". Co-produced by the band themselves as they were "starting to get pissed off with the music business" (according to Jennings in an audio interview on "Bustin' Out"), the song featured brass and segued into a dub remix. The B-side was "The Crack", a lighthearted mini-pastiche of their debut album, recorded in a number of musical styles. It peaked at No. 43 in the UK Singles Chart. The band refused an invitation to perform on ‘Top of the Pops’, as the BBC had insisted that Jennings or Fox mime Owen's vocal part, which the band found distasteful.

Virgin issued a second album later in 1980, a compilation of singles, demos and live tracks entitled Grin & Bear It. The three live tracks – "S.U.S.", "Babylon's Burning" and "Society" had been recorded for Chorus, a French TV show, in January of that year. When this was later reissued on CD, early tracks "Stepping Bondage", "Lobotomy" and "Rich Bitch" were added. 1980 also saw the collaboration of the remaining band members with Kevin Coyne on one half of his double album, Sanity Stomp. In 1981 they performed as the backing band of French singer Valérie Lagrange on her album Chez Moi.

The band continued as Ruts D.C. (D.C. standing for the Italian term da capo, meaning "back to the beginning") in a different musical vein. They released two albums, Animal Now (May 1981 on Virgin) and Rhythm Collision (July 1982 on Bohemian Records), the latter in collaboration with Mad Professor, a renowned dub producer. Ruts D.C. split in 1983.

In 1987 Dojo Records and Castle Communications released RUTS LIVE, an eleven-track album licensed from Link Communications (DOJO LP52).

In 1987, BBC label Strange Fruit collected together the group's three Radio One sessions for The Peel Session Album: The Ruts. Live albums soon followed, including BBC Radio One in Concert (Windsong) recorded at London's Paris Theatre on 7 July 1979, The Ruts Live (Dojo) and Live and Loud! (Link).

1990s and later
Virgin released The Ruts vs. The Skids EP in 1992 to promote their Three Minute Heroes compilation album. "In a Rut" and "Babylon's Burning" were lined up against the Skids' "Into the Valley" and "Working for the Yankee Dollar". Demolition Dancing (1994) was an album of live tracks recorded in 1979, two of which – "Shakin' All Over" and "In A Rut" – featured members of the Damned. Also in 1994, the German record label Vince Lombardy Highschool Records released Rules which featured sixteen tracks by the Ruts and Ruts D.C., including "Last Exit", a previously unreleased song.

1995 brought Something That I Said – The Best of the Ruts album (re-released in March 2003 and on EMI Gold in 2005).

Ruts: In a Can (2000) was an album of demos from three sessions in the period before they signed to Virgin, released in a metal tin. Fox, Jennings and Ruffy compiled and remastered this release, and also supplied liner notes. The sessions date from 25 April 1978 (8-track Fairdeal Sessions), 20 February 1979 (Underhill Studio) and Mystery Studio Sessions (early 1979).

In 2001, Virgin released Bustin' Out – The Essential Ruts Collection on CD. It included "Denial", a previously unreleased instrumental track. "Bustin' Out" was rounded out with a twenty-minute interview with Jennings. The same year, the 2-disc CD Criminal Minds appeared on Snapper in the UK. The second disc was a reissue of Live and Loud! from 1987. Anagram Records came up with a collection of unreleased tracks and alternate versions for their sixteen-track CD, In a Rut in 2002 (reissued 2008). The compilation included a snippet of John Peel praising "In a Rut", and offering to help listeners obtain a copy if it is not available in their local record shop.

Babylon's Burning Reconstructed (2005) was an album-long tribute to the band's most famous song, remixed sixteen different times by Die Toten Hosen, Don Letts, Dreadzone and the Groove Corporation. The wide range of remixes included beatbox, drum and bass and ambient reworkings.

Fox came out of semi-retirement to play Ruts songs as Foxy's Ruts with his son, Lawrence, on drums. Foxy's Ruts supported Bad Manners on their Christmas tour of the UK in December 2006.

Two retrospective live albums appeared in 2006. Get Out of It!! featured eighteen songs including a sexually-themed early number by the band, "Gotta Little Number" (also titled "Stepping Bondage") from a London Marquee show on 19 July 1979 (these recordings have also surfaced as Marquee 1979 and Ruts 1979 – Marquee Club). Live at Deeply Vale, featured thirteen songs from a July 1978 performance recorded at the free Deeply Vale festival that was held annually near Bury, Greater Manchester.

2007 reform
On 16 July 2007, the band reformed for the first time in 27 years, and played a benefit gig for Fox, following his diagnosis as having lung cancer. Henry Rollins stood in for Owen. They were supported by Tom Robinson, the Damned, Misty in Roots, UK Subs, Splodge (Splodgenessabounds), John Otway; and the Peafish House Band. Fox died on 21 October of the same year, at the age of 56.

On 25 January 2008, Henry Rollins presented The Gig, a short film about the 2007 benefit gig at London's Shepherd's Bush Empire. The event, in support of Macmillan Cancer Support, was accompanied by live performances from Alabama 3, T. V. Smith, members of the Members, the Damned's Captain Sensible and Beki Bondage.

In June 2008, another compilation, Original Punks, was released by Music Club Deluxe in the UK. The two-disc set included demos, alternate versions and live tracks plus songs recorded by Ruts D.C.

In December 2008 John "Segs" Jennings and Dave Ruffy returned to Ariwa Studios as Ruts D.C to record some new tracks with Neil "Mad Professor" Fraser. The project, entitled Rhythm Collision Vol. 2, was mixed in Brighton by Mike "Prince Fatty" Pelanconi and was finally released in 2013.

The band enlisted Leigh Heggarty on guitar, Seamus Beaghan on Hammond organ, and Molara on additional vocals and percussion, and completed some British dates supporting Alabama 3 in November and December 2011. The band also played the Rebellion Festival in August 2012, at the Empress Ballroom in Blackpool, Lancashire, alongside Rancid, Buzzcocks, Goldblade, Social Distortion, Public Image Ltd and a reformed Anti-Pasti amongst others.

Discography

Albums

Live
BBC Radio 1 Live in Concert (Windsong International – split with Penetration)
Live at Deeply Vale 1970's (2006: Ozit)
Get Out of It Live (2006: Ozit)
 Live On Stage  Ruts DC 2014 Sosumi SOSLP103

Selective compilation albums and EPs
The Peel Sessions (December 1986: Strange Fruit)
Peel Sessions – Complete Sessions 1979–1981 (May 1990: Strange Fruit)
Demolition Dancing (1994: Receiver) – mostly live material, and including two tracks with the Damned: "Shakin' All Over" and "In a Rut"
Something That I Said: The Best of the Ruts (March 1995: Virgin)
Bustin’ Out: The Essential Ruts Collection (June 2001: EMI)
The Crack/Grin and Bear It (2003, EMI; both original albums on one CD).

Singles

See also
 List of British punk bands
 List of Peel sessions
 List of performers on Top of the Pops
 Music of the United Kingdom (1970s)

References

External links
 Ruts DC website
 The official Ruts Myspace
 The Ruts on Punk77.co.uk
 
 
 

British reggae musical groups
English punk rock groups
Musical groups disestablished in 1983
Musical groups established in 1977
People from Southall
Reggae rock groups
Ska punk musical groups
ROIR artists
1977 establishments in England